Lukavac is a city located in Tuzla Canton of the Federation of Bosnia and Herzegovina, an entity of Bosnia and Herzegovina. According to the 2013 census, the town has a population of 12,061 inhabitants, with 44,520 inhabitants in the city.

Geography
Lukavac covers an area of 352,66 km2. It shares borders with cities and municipalities of: Tuzla, Živinice, Banovići, Zavidovići, Maglaj, Petrovo, Gračanica and Srebrenik.

Apart from the town, the city comprises the following villages:
Babice Donje
• Babice Gornje
• Berkovica
• Bikodže
• Bistarac Donji
• Bistarac Gornji
• Bokavići
• Borice
• Brijesnica Donja
• Brijesnica Gornja
• Caparde
• Cerik
• Crveno Brdo
• Devetak
• Dobošnica
• Gnojnica
• Huskići
• Jaruške Donje
• Jaruške Gornje
• Kalajevo
• Komari
• Krtova
• Kruševica
• Lukavac
• Lukavac Gornji
• Mičijevići
• Milino Selo
• Modrac
• Orahovica
• Poljice
• Prline
• Prokosovići
• Puračić
• Smoluća Donja
• Smoluća Gornja
• Semići
• Sižje
• Stupari
• Šikulje
• Tabaci
• Tumare
• Turija
• Vasiljevci
• Vijenac

Demographics

1971
In 1971, the population of Lukavac was 51,781, made up of:
34,010 Bosniaks (65.68%)
13,526 Serbs (26.12%)
3,111 Croats (6.00%)
613 Yugoslavs (1.18%)
521 others (1.02%)

1991
In the 1991 census, Lukavac municipality had 56,830 residents: 
Bosniaks (66.8%)
Serbs (21.5%)
Croats (3.8%)
others (8%)

2013 
In the 2013 census the municipality of Lukavac had 44,520 residents:
 Bosniaks (86.6%)
 Serbs (3.4%)
 Croats (3.4%)
 others (6.6%)

Economy

Lukavac has strong chemical industry, like the whole Tuzla region. The main factories are Soda Lukavac, member of Turkish Şişecam group and cement factory Fabrika Cementa Lukavac (FCL).

Sport
The town's football club is FK Radnički Lukavac. There is also Aikido Club "GARD" Lukavac .

Lukavac town's Karate Club (previously known as KK Reweus)  has achieved top recognitions in worldwide Karate competitions, and has produced some of the best Karate Champions in the Region.  Members of the club regularly represent Bosnia and Herzegovina's representation in world championships.

Notable residents
Amir Osmanović, footballer
Sead Osmić, footballer

Twin towns – sister cities

Lukavac is twinned with:
 Ulcinj, Montenegro
 Velenje, Slovenia

References

External links

 Official site

Cities and towns in the Federation of Bosnia and Herzegovina
Populated places in Lukavac
Municipalities of the Tuzla Canton